The following is a list of episodes from the Playhouse Disney/Disney Junior series Imagination Movers.

Series overview

Episodes

Season 1 (2008–2009)

Season 2 (2009–2010)

Season 3 (2011–2013)

Imagination Movers in Concert
Originally aired on March 6, 2011, there is a special episode that aired during Season 3 called "Imagination Movers in Concert," taking place at a live Imagination Movers concert, including some songs like Shakable You, On My Way Home, and My Favorite Snack.

References

Lists of American children's television series episodes